Leeching may refer to:
Leeching (medical), also called Hirudotherapy, the use of leeches for bloodletting or medical therapy
Leeching (computing), using others' information or effort without providing anything in return
Image leeching, direct linking to an object, such as an image, on a remote site

See also
Leaching (disambiguation)